Beast Mode may refer to:

Music

Albums
Beast Mode (Juvenile album), a 2010 album by American rapper Juvenile
Beast Mode (mixtape), a 2015 mixtape by American rapper Future
Beast Mode, a 2015 EP by American rapper Jaden Smith

Songs
"Beast Mode", a song by B.o.B (2011)
"Beastmode", a song on Liquid Assassin's album Cardell (2011)
"Beast Mode", a song on Ludacris' album Ludaversal (2015)
"Beast Mode", a song on A Boogie wit da Hoodie's album The Bigger Artist (2017)
"Beast Mode", a song by Anirudh on the soundtrack of the film Beast (2022)

People
Marshawn Lynch (born 1986), American football running back nicknamed "Beast Mode"
Rhys Mathieson (born 1997), Australian rules footballer nicknamed "Beast Mode"
Adebayo Akinfenwa (born 1982), English footballer nicknamed "The Beast", with a clothing label "Beast Mode On"

Other
Beast Mode (film), a 2020 horror comedy film starring C. Thomas Howell
The activation code used by the Maximals and Predacons in Transformers: Beast Wars to transform from robot to beast.